Christus is an opera in seven scenes with a prologue and epilogue by Anton Rubinstein, written between the years 1887–1893 to a libretto after a poem by Heinrich Bulthaupt.

Background
Christus was described by its composer as a 'sacred opera'. This is a term invented by Rubinstein, ('geistliche Oper' in German) denoting staged works with 'use of polyphonic choruses and a sober, edifying style relying on ‘exalted declamation’.' Rubinstein composed three other works of this type, Sulamith, Moses and Der Thurm zu Babel (The Tower of Babel). A fifth sacred opera, Cain, was uncompleted at his death.

Rubinstein considered Christus to be his finest composition.

Performance history
Parts of the work were performed in Berlin in April 1894, and Rubinstein conducted a complete performance in Stuttgart on 2 June 1894. This was in fact his last public appearance as a conductor. The work received a further series of complete performances, at Bremen, in 1895. Applause between scenes and after the performance was forbidden. Apparently the work was not revived until a performance in Tyumen in 2002, conducted by the composer's great-grandson, Anton Sharoyev. This was also therefore the work's first performance in Russia. A recording of part of the work was made from live performances under Sharoyev in St. Petersburg in 2003.

Roles

Synopsis
Christus treats the life of Jesus according to the New Testament. It is made up of the following scenes:

Outside the stable at Bethlehem; the three kings arrive to pay homage.
Jesus arguing with Satan in the desert 
His baptism by John
Jesus performs miracles and defends Mary Magdalene.
Jesus's anger in the Temple
The last supper and Jesus's arrest
The trial before Pilate
The crucifixion (off-stage):  demons and angels battle.
St Paul leads praise of Christ.

Notes

Sources
 Anon, Sleeve notes to recording of Christus; Anton Sharoyev conducting Tyumen State Philharominc Orchestra, 2003,"Zvuk" ZV - 11 03207
 Graham Dixon and Richard Taruskin. "Sacred opera." Grove Music Online accessed 17 April 2010
 H Krehbiel, A Second Book of Operas, accessed 17 April 2010
 Charles Maclean, Rubinstein as Composer for the Pianoforte (January–March 1914).  Sammelbände der Internationalen Musikgesellschaft 15. Jahrg. (H. 2.): pp. 360–374.
 R. Taruskin, Christian Themes in Russian Opera: A Millennial Essay(March 1990).  Cambridge Opera Journal, 2 (1): pp. 83–91.

Operas by Anton Rubinstein
German-language operas
Operas
Operas based on the Bible
Operas based on real people
Operas set in the 1st century
1894 operas
Depictions of Jesus in music
Cultural depictions of John the Baptist
Cultural depictions of Mary, mother of Jesus
Cultural depictions of Paul the Apostle